The 2001 Polish Figure Skating Championships were held in Warsaw between December 15 and 17, 2000.

Senior results

Men

Ladies

Ice dancing

Junior results

Men

Ladies

Pairs

Ice dancing

External links
 Archive results

Polish Figure Skating Championships
Polish Figure Skating Championships, 2001
Polish Figure Skating Championships, 2001